Mitchell or Mitchel, sometimes abbreviated as Mitch, is a male given name, derived from the surname. It is Anglo-Norman in origin.

People
Mitchell Aubusson (born 1987), Australian rugby league footballer
Mitch Austin (born 1991), Australian footballer
Mitchell Ayres (1909–1969), American orchestra leader, music arranger, composer and performer
Mitchell Baker (born 1957), American chairperson of the Mozilla Foundation and chairperson and former chief executive officer of the Mozilla Corporation
Mitch Benn (born 1970), English comedian and satirist, known for his musical parodies
Mitchell Berman, American Professor of Law at the University of Pennsylvania Law School
Mitchell Boggs (born 1984), American Major League Baseball pitcher
Mitch Brown (rugby league) (born 1987), Australian rugby league player
Mitchell Burgess, American Emmy Award-winning writer and producer
Mitchell Butler (born 1970), American sports agent and former basketball player
Mitch Clark (Australian footballer) (born 1987), Australian rules footballer
Mitch Clark (footballer, born 1999), Welsh footballer
Mitchell Cole (1985–2012), English footballer
Mitch Cornish (born 1993), Australian rugby league player
Mitchell Dodds (born 1989), Australian rugby league player
Mitchell Donald (born 1988), Dutch footballer
Mitch Easter (born 1954), American musician, songwriter, and record producer
Mitchell Feigenbaum (1944–2019), American mathematical physicist
Mitchell Froom (born 1953), American musician and record producer
Mitchell Gale (born 1990), American football player
Mitch Golby (born 1991), Australian rules footballer
Mitch Grassi (born 1992), American musician, YouTube personality, and member of a capella band Pentatonix
Mitch Harris (born 1970), American guitarist and member of the grindcore band Napalm Death
Mitch Hedberg (1968–2005), American comedian
Mitchell Henry (1826–1910), English financier, politician and Member of Parliament
Mitchell Hepburn (1896–1953), Canadian politician, youngest premier of Ontario
Mitch Hewer (born 1989), British actor who plays Maxxie in Skins
Mitchell Hurwitz (born 1963), American television writer and producer, creator of Arrested Development and co-creator of The Ellen Show
Mitchell Islam (born 1990), Canadian ice dancer
Mitchell Jenkins 1896–1977), American politician
Mitchell Joachim (born 1972), American architect and professor
Mitchell Johnson (disambiguation), several people
Mitch Kapor (born 1950), chairman of Mozilla Foundation
Mitch Kupchak (born 1954), American National Basketball Association player and general manager
Mitch Landrieu (born 1960), American politician
Mitchell Langerak (born 1988), Australian football goalkeeper
Mitchell Leisen (1898–1972), American director, art director and costume designer
 Mitchell Lewis (actor) (1880–1956), American film actor
 Mitchell Lewis (footballer) (born 1998), Australian footballer
 Mitch Lewis (born 1954), Canadian multi-instrumentalist
Mitch Lucker (1984–2012), American vocalist of the extreme metal band Suicide Silence
Mitchel H. Mark (1868–1918), pioneer of motion picture exhibition in the United States
Mitch Marner (born 1997), Canadian ice hockey player
Mitchell Marsh (born 1991), Australian cricketer
Mitchell McClenaghan (born 1986), New Zealand cricketer
Mitch McConnell (born 1942), United States senator
Mitch Miller (1911–2010), American musician
Mitch Mustain (born 1988), American college football player
Mitchel Musso (born 1991), American child actor and singer
Mitchell Page (1951–2011), American Major League Baseball player
Mitchell Paige (1918–2003), American Marine awarded the Medal of Honor in World War II
Mitchell Pearce (born 1989), Australian rugby league footballer
Mitchell Perry (born 2000), Australian cricketer
Mitch Pileggi (born 1952), American actor
Mitch Potter (born 1980), American track and field athlete
Mitchell Rales (born 1956), American billionaire businessman and art collector
Mitch Richmond (born 1965), American National Basketball Association player
Mitch Robinson (born 1989), Australian rules footballer
Mitchell Ryan (1934–2022), American actor
Mitchell Schwartz (born 1989), American collegiate and National Football League player
Mitchell Scoggins, American politician
Mitchell Sharp (1911–2004), Canadian politician
Mitchell Swepson (born 1993), Australian cricketer
Mitchell Starc (born 1990), Australian cricketer
Mitchell Symons (born 1957), British writer
Mitchell Thomas (born 1964), English footballer
Mitchell Torok (1929–2017), American country music singer, songwriter and guitarist'
Mitchell Trubisky (born 1994), American football player
Mitchell Ward, American football player
Mitchell Watt (born 1988), Australian long jumper
Mitchell Weiser (born 1994), German footballer
Mitchell Wiggins (born 1959), American retired basketball player
Mitchell Wilcox (born 1996), American football player
Mitch Williams (born 1964), Major League Baseball relief pitcher
Mitch Young (born 1961), American football player

Fictional characters
Mitch Buchannon, the main character of Baywatch
Mitchell Mayo / Condiment King, villain of Batman from DC Comics 
Mitch McColl, in the soap opera Home and Away
 Mitchell Peterson, a supporting character in Ready Jet Go!
Kate Mitchell in the soap opera EastEnders
Kathy Mitchell in the soap opera EastEnders
Phil Mitchell in the soap opera EastEnders
Sam Mitchell in the soap opera EastEnders
Ben Mitchell in the soap opera EastEnders
Honey Mitchell in the soap opera EastEnders
Billy Mitchell in the soap opera EastEnders
Jay Mitchell (EastEnders) in the soap opera EastEnders
Sharon Mitchell in the soap opera EastEnders
Peggy Mitchell in the soap opera EastEnders
Tiffany Mitchell in the soap opera EastEnders
Courtney Mitchell in the soap opera EastEnders
Sal Mitchell in the soap opera EastEnders
Roxy Mitchell in the soap opera EastEnders
Ronnie Mitchell in the soap opera EastEnders
Louise Mitchell in the soap opera EastEnders
Janet Mitchell in the soap opera EastEnders
Archie Mitchell in the soap opera EastEnders
Lola Mitchell in the soap opera EastEnders
Matthew Mitchell Coton in the soap opera EastEnders
Ted Mitchell in the soap opera EastEnders
Raymond Dawkins in the soap opera EastEnders
Madge Mitchell in the soap opera EastEnders
Lexi Mitchell in the soap opera EastEnders
Amy Mitchell in the soap opera EastEnders
Dennis Rickman Jnr in the soap opera EastEnders
Jamie Mitchell in the soap opera EastEnders

See also
Mitchell (surname)

Given names
Masculine given names
English masculine given names
English-language masculine given names